Morgan Figgins (born 29 March 1992 in Auckland, New Zealand) is a New Zealand figure skater. She is a five time New Zealand national champion and a four time New Zealand junior national champion. She was the youngest New Zealand skater to skate in the senior division at age 12 when she won her first senior title, and the youngest to skate and obtain the junior title at age 11.  She currently resides in Dunedin, New Zealand, and coaches part-time at the Dunedin ice rink.

Competitive highlights 
 JGP: Junior Grand Prix

Singles

Pairs with Howie

References

External links
 

New Zealand figure skaters
1992 births
Living people
Sportspeople from Auckland
New Zealand sportswomen
Sportspeople from Dunedin